In psychology, persistence (PS) is a personality trait. 
It is measured in the Temperament and Character Inventory (TCI) and is considered one of the four temperament traits. Persistence refers to perseverance in spite of fatigue or frustration. 
Cloninger's research found that persistence, like the other temperament traits, is highly heritable.
The subscales of PS in TCI-R consist of:

 Eagerness of effort (PS1)
 Work hardened (PS2)
 Ambitious (PS3)
 Perfectionist (PS4)

A study comparing the Temperament and Character Inventory to the five factor model of personality found that persistence was substantially associated with conscientiousness. Additionally, persistence was moderately positively associated with the TCI trait of self-transcendence. Research has also found that persistence is positively correlated with Activity in Zuckerman's Alternative Five model, and is negatively correlated with psychoticism in Eysenck's model.

References

Personality traits